Anghei Anghelov (more frequently transliterated as Angel Angelov) (born July 10, 1948) is a former boxer from Bulgaria, who won a silver medal in the light welterweight division the 1972 Summer Olympics. Anghelov lost by decision in the final to American boxer Sugar Ray Seales.

1972 Olympic Results

Below are the results of Angel Angelov, a Bulgarian light welterweight boxer who competed at the 1972 Munich Olympics:

 Round of 32: defeated Luis Contreras (Venezuela) by third-round TKO
 Round of 16: defeated Walter Desiderio Gomez (Argentina) by decision, 4-1
 Quarterfinal: defeated Srisook Bantow (Thailand) by second-round TKO
 Semi-final: defeated Issaka Daborg (Niger) bey decision, 5-0
 Gold medal match: lost to Sugar Ray Seales (United States) by decision, 2-3 (was awarded silver medal)

References
Olympic DB Profile

Boxers at the 1972 Summer Olympics
Olympic boxers of Bulgaria
Olympic silver medalists for Bulgaria
Living people
1948 births
Olympic medalists in boxing
Bulgarian male boxers
Medalists at the 1972 Summer Olympics
Light-welterweight boxers